A huddle is an action of a sports team gathering together to talk to one another.

Huddle may also refer to:

 Huddle (surname) (including a list of persons with the name)
 Huddle (software), for collaboration and content management 
 Huddle (film), a 1932 American movie
 Slack_(software)#Huddles, a group live communication tool in Slack
 Huddling, a form of kleptothermy (thermoregulation in biology)

See also 
 
 Hudl, a software product and service to review game footage
 Tesco Hudl, a tablet computer